Dawson Deaton (born May 6, 1999) is an American football center for the Cleveland Browns of the National Football League (NFL). He played college football at Texas Tech and was drafted by the Browns in the seventh round of the 2022 NFL Draft.

College career
Deaton was ranked as a threestar recruit by 247Sports.com coming out of high school. He committed to Texas Tech on February 13, 2016, over offers from Houston, Iowa State, and Utah.

Professional career
Deaton was drafted by the Cleveland Browns with the 246th pick in the seventh round of the 2022 NFL Draft. He was placed on injured reserve on August 16, 2022, one day after tearing his anterior cruciate ligament during practice.

References

External links
 Cleveland Browns bio
 Texas Tech Red Raiders bio

Living people
American football centers
Texas Tech Red Raiders football players
Cleveland Browns players
People from Frisco, Texas
Players of American football from Texas
Sportspeople from the Dallas–Fort Worth metroplex
1999 births